Lohia Roger Levasa (born May 18, 1959) is a former American football offensive lineman. He played in the United States Football League for the three years with the Oakland Invaders and Portland Breakers. Levasa played college football at Oregon State (1978–1981) and started 37 games during his career. He prepped at Long Beach Polytechnic High School.

Levasa resides in Tualatin, Oregon, where he is associate pastor at Horizon Community Church.

References

External links
Fanbase.com profile

1959 births
Living people
American football centers
Oregon State Beavers football players
People from Tualatin, Oregon
Oakland Invaders players
Boston/New Orleans/Portland Breakers players
Oregon clergy
Sportspeople from the Portland metropolitan area
Players of American football from Long Beach, California
Players of American football from Oregon